Minuscule 521 (in the Gregory-Aland numbering), ε 443 (in the Soden numbering), is a Greek minuscule manuscript of the New Testament, on a parchment. It is dated by a colophon to the year 1321 or 1322. 
Scrivener labelled it by number 562. The manuscript has complex context.

Description 

The codex contains a complete text of the four Gospels on 271 parchment leaves (size ). It is written in one column per page, 20 lines per page.

There is no division according to the Ammonian Sections, with references to the Eusebian Canons.

Text 

The Greek text of the codex is a representative of the Byzantine text-type. Hermann von Soden classified it to the textual family Kr. Aland placed it in Category V.
According to the Claremont Profile Method it represents Kr in Luke 1 and Luke 20. In Luke 10 no profile was made. It creates textual subgroup with the codex 35.

History 

The manuscript was bought by book-dealer Payne (?), from London. Then it belonged to Thomas Thorpe, another book-dealer in London. It was sold in 1824 to Theodore Williams, Vicar of Hendon, for £120 (about £ today). Joseph Mendham bought it for £70 in 1827. It was given by Mendham's widow to Dean Burgon, afterwards to the Bodleian Library.

The manuscript was added to the list of New Testament minuscule manuscripts by Scrivener (562) and C. R. Gregory (521).

It is currently housed at the Bodleian Library (MS. Gr. bib. d. 1) in Oxford.

See also 

 List of New Testament minuscules
 Biblical manuscript
 Textual criticism

References

Further reading 

 

Greek New Testament minuscules
14th-century biblical manuscripts
Bodleian Library collection